Marie-France Dufour or Marie (8 August 1949 in Nancy – 18 October 1990) was a French singer. She made her hit Soleil in 1971, but she is probably best known for representing Monaco in the Eurovision Song Contest 1973 in Luxembourg by song "Un train qui part". She was also featured in Les Misérables as Éponine. She died of leukemia at the age of 41 in 1990.

External links
 Official website
 
 

1949 births
1990 deaths
Musicians from Nancy, France
Eurovision Song Contest entrants for Monaco
Eurovision Song Contest entrants of 1973
Deaths from leukemia
Dufour, Marie-France
20th-century French women singers